The 1999 World Indoor Target Archery Championships were held in Havana, Cuba from 6 - 10 March 1999.

Medal summary (Men's individual)

Medal summary (Women's individual)

Medal summary (Men's team)

Medal summary (Women's team)

References

E
World Indoor Archery Championships
1999 in Italian sport
International archery competitions hosted by Italy